Ras Ibn Hani is a small cape located  north of Latakia, Syria on the Mediterranean Sea. It is an important archaeological site as it was occupied almost continuously from the late Bronze Age until Byzantine times. The site now is in a major resort area called the Cote d'Azur of Syria.

History
This coastal site lies a two-hour walk from the site of Bronze Age Ugarit. During the middle of the 14th-century BC, a golden age began for Ugarit after stable borders had been achieved through treaties with the Egyptians. During this phase of expansion, a second residence for the king, for example as a summer palace (south palace), and a residence for queen Ahatmilku were built. There were probably fewer than the 6,000 to 8,000 inhabitants who, according to estimates, lived there in the 13th century BC.

However, it survived in modest fashion Ugarit's collapse at the end of the Bronze Age: "Ugarit's inhabitants dispersed, but no crisis could neutralize their invaluable asset, the coast's best natural harbour on the promontory of Ras ibn Hani; it became known from its low white cliff as the 'White Harbour' in later Greek coastal guidebooks, a name which persists in modern Arabic as Minet el-Beida", observes Robin Lane Fox, who identified Ras Ibn Hani as the site later Greeks knew as Betyllion, possibly a Hellenized version, he suggests, of the Semitic bait-El or "house of El, a name which, if that is the derivation, "confirms that Canaanite-Phoenician culture never entirely died at the site".

Ras Ibn Hani had a Ptolemaic base, since the Third Syrian War (246–241 BC). The Seleucid King Antiochus IX  BC had a small fortification built in the southeast corner.

Robin Lane Fox notes that the Roman emperor Trajan landed at this spot to join his troops in Syria for the fateful Mesopotamian campaigns of 114–117.

During the first three centuries AD, the city was practically uninhabited, there were probably some buildings on the western tip of the peninsula, the location of which can no longer be explored, as the area has been built over in the meantime. Building remains, pot fragments and coin finds indicate settlement in the early Byzantine period from the 4th to the 6th century.

See also
Cities of the ancient Near East
Minet el-Beida
Ugarit

References

Bibliography

Former populated places in Syria
Headlands of Syria
Ugarit
Bronze Age sites in Syria
Archaeological sites in Latakia Governorate